Nicole Morrisey O’Donnell is an American law enforcement officer who currently serves as the 41st Sheriff of Multnomah County, Oregon, the county where Portland is located.

Career 
Morrisey O'Donnell attended the University of Portland. She started at the Sheriff's office in 1996 as a Deputy, before being promoted to lieutenant, captain, chief deputy and undersheriff. She was elected Sheriff in 2022 with 62% of the vote, defeating Captain Derrick Peterson and Corrections Deputy Nicholas Alberts, both employees of the Sheriff's Office.

Electoral history

References

Year of birth missing (living people)
Living people
Multnomah County, Oregon
Sheriffs' offices of Oregon